The International Conference on Creationism (ICC) is a conference in support of young earth creationism, sponsored by the Creation Science Fellowship (CSF). The first conference occurred in 1986 at Duquesne University in Pittsburgh. Subsequent conferences have been held in 1990, 1994, 1998, 2003, 2008, 2013 and 2018.

Conferences

Robert Schadewald emphasized the influence Kurt Wise has had on shaping a more candid and rigorous approach to creationism, particularly praising a talk entitled "How Geologists Date Things" as absolutely straight Geology 101 mixing introductory geology with a debunking of creationist misconceptions. Wise has labored tirelessly by example and persuasion to convince his creationist colleagues to study the facts carefully and find new ways to interpret them. Besides technical and educational tracks, ICC86 featured a "basic creationism" track that included Walter Brown's Hydroplate Model (some creationists privately referred to it as the "wacky track").

  The second ICC, held in 1990, was marginally better, but evolution-bashing and "wacky track" nonsense still were abundant. The 1990 conference featured a debate between Gregg Wilkerson, an old-earth creationist geologist and Steven A. Austin, chairman of geology at the Institute for Creation Research. Wilkerson urged the conference attendees to drop the young Earth viewpoint and accept the "ample scientific evidence" that the Earth is 4.5 billion years old.  Austin stated that Wilkerson was misinterpreting the data and that a young Earth viewpoint remained feasible.

 Following ICC90, the Pittsburgh Creation Science Fellowship (CSF) established a refereeing system. Wise and philosophers Paul Nelson and John Mark Reynolds convinced CSF that evolution-bashing never has advanced and never will advance a real "creation model." As a result, ICC94 was dramatically better.

At ICC98, the transformation was virtually complete. Most presentations tried either to advance a model in some way or at least to honestly review the evidence that needs explaining. This requirement was stated in the call for papers and enforced in the refereeing process, Anyone whose only exposure to creationism is a Gish Gallop would not have recognized a single presentation at ICC98. Larry Witham described it as having "become the preeminent meeting of its kind in the world." Its goal is to provide a peer-review forum wherein the Creation model could be rigorously developed. He states that the conferences express similar disdain for both "slipshod" populist young earth creationism, and for smuggling in "antiquity and evolution". He describes as "astounding" their presupposition that God "used processes which are not now operating anywhere in the natural universe." They state they cannot discover by scientific investigation anything about the creative processes used by the Creator.

Reception
Mathematics professor Jason Rosenhouse writes expressing sadness that while generally impressed with attendees "personality and temperament", that they are "hopelessly ignorant of science. This ignorance is exacerbated by the annoying fact that so many of them fancy themselves highly knowledgeable indeed."

References

External links
 International Conference on Creationism

Young Earth creationism
Christian conferences
Recurring events established in 1987
1987 establishments in Indiana